The Handball events at the 1995 All-Africa Games were held in Harare, Zimbabwe on September 1995.

Qualified teams

Final tournament

All times are local (UTC+2).

Matches

Tournament classification

References

 
1995 All-Africa Games
1995
African Games
Handball